Steven J. Sibener is a scientist at the University of Chicago who studies surface chemistry, physics, and materials research, as well as thin film polymer dynamics and AFM imaging studies of bacterial cell wall structure. He is also a Faculty member of the Center for Bright Beams.

Awards
 Carl William Eisendrath Professor
 Fellow, American Physical Society.
 Fellow, American Association for the Advancement of Science, 2006–.
 1996 Chairman, Division of Chemical Physics, American Physical Society.
 1992–1993 Visiting Fellow, Joint Institute for Laboratory Astrophysics, Univ. of Colorado, Boulder.
 1988 Marlow Medal of the Faraday Division of the Royal Society of Chemistry.
 1984–1986 IBM Faculty Development Award.
 1983–1987 Alfred P. Sloan Fellow.
 1980 Camille and Henry Dreyfus Young Faculty in Chemistry Award.

References

External links 
 http://chemistry.uchicago.edu/faculty/faculty/person/member/steven-j-sibener.html
 http://sibener-group.uchicago.edu/

Living people
Fellows of the American Physical Society
Fellows of the American Association for the Advancement of Science
21st-century American chemists
Year of birth missing (living people)